Martin Frič (29 March 1902 – 26 August 1968) was a Czech film director, screenwriter and actor. He had more than 100 directing credits between 1929 and 1968, including feature films, shorts and documentary films.

Throughout his life, Frič struggled with alcoholism. On the day of the Warsaw Pact invasion of Czechoslovakia in 1968, he attempted suicide, after battling cancer. He died in the hospital five days later.

Filmography

 Páter Vojtěch (1929)
 Varhaník u sv. Víta (1929)
 Vše pro lásku (1930)
 Chudá holka (1930)
 On a jeho sestra (1931)
 Dobrý voják Švejk (1931)
 Der Zinker (1931)
 To neznáte Hadimršku (1931)
 Sestra Angelika (1932)
 Wehe, wenn er losgelassen (1932)
 The Ringer (1932)
 Anton Špelec, ostrostřelec (1932)
 Lelíček ve službách Sherlocka Holmese (1932)
 Život je pes (1933)
 S vyloučením veřejnosti (1933)
 Pobočník Jeho Výsosti (1933)
 Kantor Ideál (1933)
 The Inspector General (1933)
 Dvanáct křesel (1933)
 U snědeného krámu (1933)
 Poslední muž (1934)
 Mazlíček (1934)
 Der Adjutant Seiner Hoheit (1934)
 Der Doppelbräutigam (1934)
 Hej-Rup! (1934)
 Jedenácté přikázání (1935)
 Jánošík (1935)
 Held einer Nacht (1935)
 Ať žije nebožtík (1935)
 Hrdina jedné noci (1935)
 Ulička v ráji (1936)
 Švadlenka (1936)
 Páter Vojtěch (1936)
 Mravnost nade vše (1936)
 Svět patří nám (1937)
 Krok do tmy (1937)
 Lidé na kře (1937)
 Advokátka Věra (1937)
 Tři vejce do skla (1937)
 Hordubalové (1938)
 Škola základ života (1938)
 Muž z neznáma (1939)
 Kristián (1939)
 Jiný vzduch (1939)
 Cesta do hlubin študákovy duše (1939)
 Eva tropí hlouposti (1939)
 Katakomby (1940)
 Muzikantská Liduška (1940)
 Baron Prásil (1940)
 Druhá směna (1940)
 Těžký život dobrodruha (1941)
 Tetička (1941)
 Roztomilý člověk (1941)
 Hotel Modrá hvězda (1941)
 Valentin Dobrotivý (1942)
 Barbora Hlavsová (1943)
 Der zweite Schuß (1943)
 Experiment (1943)
 Počestné paní pardubické (1944)
 Dir zuliebe (1944)
 Prstýnek (1944)
 Černí myslivci (1945)
 13. revír (1946)
 Varúj...! (1946)
 Čapkovy povídky (1947)
 Návrat domů (1948)
 Polibek ze stadionu (1948)
 Pytlákova schovanka aneb Šlechetný milionář (1949)
 Pětistovka (1949)
 Zocelení (1950)
 Bylo to v máji (1951)
 Past (1951)
 Císařův pekař - Pekařův císař (1952)
 Tajemství krve (1953)
 Psohlavci (1955)
 Nechte to na mně (1955)
 Zaostřit, prosím! (1956)
 Povodeň (1958)
 Dnes naposled (1958)
 The Princess with the Golden Star (1959)
 Bílá spona (1960)
 Dařbuján a Pandrhola (1960)
 Král Králů (1963)
 Hvězda zvaná Pelyněk (1964)
 Lidé z maringotek (1966)
 Přísně tajné premiéry (1967)
 Nejlepší ženská mého života (1968)

References

External links

 
1902 births
1968 suicides
Male actors from Prague
People from the Kingdom of Bohemia
Czech film directors
Czech male film actors
Czech male silent film actors
Czechoslovak film directors
Czech screenwriters
Male screenwriters
German-language film directors
Silent film directors
20th-century Czech male actors
Suicides in Czechoslovakia
Suicides in the Czech Republic
1968 deaths
20th-century screenwriters